Giacomo Gotifredo Ferrari (baptised 2 April 1763 – 2 December 1842) was born in Rovereto in the Italian Alps, and was an Italian composer and singing teacher who spent most of his career in France and England. Four of his operas, I due svizzeri, II Rinaldo d'Asti, L'eroina di Raab, and Lo sbaglio fortunato premiered in the King's Theatre, London. He also composed two ballets, a Mass, and numerous piano sonatas.

Principal works
Operas
I due Svizzeri (opera buffa in one act, premiered King's Theatre, London, 14 May 1799)
II Rinaldo d'Asti (opera buffa in two acts, premiered King's Theatre, London, 16 March 1802)
L'eroina di Raab (opera seria in two acts, premiered King's Theatre, London, 8 April 1813)
Lo sbaglio fortunato (opera buffa in one act, premiered King's Theatre, London 8 May 1817)

Ballets
Borea e Zeffiro (premiered King's Theatre, London, 1805)
La dama di spirito a Napoli (premiered King's Theatre, London, 1809)

Books
Breve tratto di canto italiano, also published in English translation as Concise Treatise on Italian Singing (1818)
Studio di musica teorica pratica (1830)
Anedotti piacevoli e interessanti occorsi nella vita Giacomo Gotifredo Ferrari, da Rovereto (1830).

References
Notes

Sources
Di Marco, Alessandra (1996). "Ferrari, Iacopo (Giacomo) Gotifredo". Dizionario Biografico degli Italiani, Vol 46. Treccani. Retrieved online 28 May 2013 .
Ferrari, Giacomo Gotifredo (1830). Aneddoti piacevoli ed interessanti occorsi nella vita di Giacomo Gotifredo Ferrari da Roveredo (facs. ed. R. Vettori, Rovereto 1992).
 Ferrari, Giacomo Gotifredo (1830). Pleasing and Interesting Anecdotes: An Autobiography of Giacomo Gotifredo Ferrari  translated from the Italian original by Stephen Thompson Moore. (Hillsdale: Pendragon Press, 2017). Series: Lives in Music no. 12.
Gehring, Franz (1900). "Ferrari, Giacomo Gotifredo" in George Grove (ed.) A Dictionary of Music and Musicians, Vol. 1, p. 513. Macmillan
Saint-Foix, Georges (1939). "A Musical Traveler: Giacomo Gotifredo Ferrari (1759-1842)" (translated by Arthur Mendel). The Musical Quarterly, Vol. 25, No. 4, pp. 455–465. Retrieved online 28 May 2013 .
Slonimsky, Nicolas and Kuhn, Laura (2001). "Ferrari, Giacomo Gotifredo". Baker's Biographical Dictionary of Musicians. Retrieved online via HighBeam Research 28 May 2013 .
Vettori, Romano (2012)."Giacomo Gotifredo Ferrari e la musica per tastiera", Rovereto, Accademia di Musica Antica.

External links
 
Ferrari's 1830 autobiography Aneddoti piacevoli e interessanti occorsi nella vita di Giacomo Gotifredo Ferrari, da Rovereto on Archive.org 
Premio Ferrari International Fortepiano Competition

1763 births
1842 deaths
Italian classical composers
Italian male classical composers
Italian opera composers
Male opera composers
Voice teachers
People from Rovereto